The 1992–93 NBA season was the fifth season for the Charlotte Hornets in the National Basketball Association. In the 1992 NBA draft, the Hornets selected Alonzo Mourning out of Georgetown University with the second overall pick. The team signed free agent David Wingate during the first month of the regular season, then later on traded J.R. Reid to the San Antonio Spurs in exchange for Sidney Green in December, and released Tom Hammonds to free agency as he later on signed with the Denver Nuggets. With the addition of Mourning, along with second-year star Larry Johnson and Muggsy Bogues, the Hornets struggled losing four of their first six games, but then went on a five-game winning streak afterwards, held a 26–23 record at the All-Star break, and won 9 of their final 12 games, finishing their season third in the Central Division with a 44–38 record, and qualified for their first ever playoff appearance.

In the Eastern Conference First Round of the playoffs, the Hornets faced off against the 4th-seeded Boston Celtics. After losing Game 1 on the road, 112–101, the Hornets would win the next three games, thus the series, when Mourning sunk a  jumper at the buzzer in a Game 4 home win over the Celtics, 104–103. The team became the first of the four expansion franchises of the late 1980s to win a playoff series. However, in the Eastern Conference Semi-finals, the Hornets were eliminated by the New York Knicks in five games. The Hornets led the NBA in home-game attendance for the fourth time in five seasons.

Johnson averaged 22.1 points and 10.5 rebounds per game, and was named to the All-NBA Second Team, and selected for the 1993 NBA All-Star Game, while Mourning averaged 21.0 points, 10.3 rebounds and 3.5 blocks per game, was named to the NBA All-Rookie First Team, and finished in second place in Rookie of the Year voting behind Shaquille O'Neal of the Orlando Magic. In addition, Bogues provided the team with 10.0 points, 8.8 assists and 2.0 steals per game, while Kendall Gill averaged 16.9 points and 1.4 steals per game, sixth man Dell Curry provided them with 15.3 points per game off the bench, and Johnny Newman contributed 11.9 points per game. Kenny Gattison provided with 6.8 points and 4.7 rebounds per game off the bench, and Wingate contributed 6.1 points per game.

Following the season, Gill was traded to the Seattle SuperSonics, and Green was released to free agency.

Offseason

NBA Draft

Roster

Regular season

Season standings

z - clinched division title
y - clinched division title
x - clinched playoff spot

Record vs. opponents

Game log

Regular season

|- align="center" bgcolor="#ccffcc"
| 1
| November 6, 1992
| Washington
| W 126–119
|
|
|
| Charlotte Coliseum
| 1–0
|- align="center" bgcolor="#ffcccc"
| 2
| November 8, 1992
| @ Cleveland
| L 107–127
|
|
|
| Richfield Coliseum
| 1–1
|- align="center" bgcolor="#ccffcc"
| 3
| November 10, 1992
| @ Orlando
| W 112–108
|
|
|
| Orlando Arena
| 2–1
|- align="center" bgcolor="#ffcccc"
| 4
| November 11, 1992
| Boston
| L 99–109
|
|
|
| Charlotte Coliseum
| 2–2
|- align="center" bgcolor="#ffcccc"
| 5
| November 13, 1992
| @ Indiana
| L 109–110
|
|
|
| Market Square Arena
| 2–3
|- align="center" bgcolor="#ffcccc"
| 6
| November 14, 1992
| Miami
| L 95–104
|
|
|
| Charlotte Coliseum
| 2–4
|- align="center" bgcolor="#ccffcc"
| 7
| November 17, 1992
| Dallas
| W 134–111
|
|
|
| Charlotte Coliseum
| 3–4
|- align="center" bgcolor="#ccffcc"
| 8
| November 20, 1992
| Golden State
| W 117–110 (OT)
|
|
|
| Charlotte Coliseum
| 4–4
|- align="center" bgcolor="#ccffcc"
| 9
| November 21, 1992
| @ Miami
| W 123–111
|
|
|
| Miami Arena
| 5–4
|- align="center" bgcolor="#ccffcc"
| 10
| November 24, 1992
| Philadelphia
| W 127–119
|
|
|
| Charlotte Coliseum
| 6–4
|- align="center" bgcolor="#ccffcc"
| 11
| November 25, 1992
| @ Detroit
| W 101–97
|
|
|
| The Palace of Auburn Hills
| 7–4
|- align="center" bgcolor="#ffcccc"
| 12
| November 27, 1992
| @ Boston
| L 102–111
|
|
|
| Boston Garden
| 7–5
|- align="center" bgcolor="#ffcccc"
| 13
| November 28, 1992
| Indiana
| L 122–134
|
|
|
| Charlotte Coliseum
| 7–6

|- align="center" bgcolor="#ffcccc"
| 14
| December 1, 1992
| @ Phoenix
| L 90–108
|
|
|
| America West Arena
| 7–7
|- align="center" bgcolor="#ccffcc"
| 15
| December 2, 1992
| @ Golden State
| W 111–110
|
|
|
| Oakland-Alameda County Coliseum Arena
| 8–7
|- align="center" bgcolor="#ccffcc"
| 16
| December 4, 1992
| @ Sacramento
| W 112–111
|
|
|
| ARCO Arena
| 9–7
|- align="center" bgcolor="#ffcccc"
| 17
| December 5, 1992
| @ L.A. Clippers
| L 109–119
|
|
|
| Los Angeles Memorial Sports Arena
| 9–8
|- align="center" bgcolor="#ffcccc"
| 18
| December 9, 1992
| Phoenix
| L 101–110
|
|
|
| Charlotte Coliseum
| 9–9
|- align="center" bgcolor="#ccffcc"
| 19
| December 10, 1992
| @ New York
| W 110–103 (OT)
|
|
|
| Madison Square Garden
| 10–9
|- align="center" bgcolor="#ccffcc"
| 20
| December 12, 1992
| Denver
| W 109–100
|
|
|
| Charlotte Coliseum
| 11–9
|- align="center" bgcolor="#ffcccc"
| 21
| December 15, 1992
| @ Chicago
| L 110–125
|
|
|
| Chicago Stadium
| 11–10
|- align="center" bgcolor="#ffcccc"
| 22
| December 16, 1992
| Utah
| L 91–93
|
|
|
| Charlotte Coliseum
| 11–11
|- align="center" bgcolor="#ccffcc"
| 23
| December 19, 1992
| @ Washington
| W 126–117
|
|
|
| Capital Centre
| 12–11
|- align="center" bgcolor="#ccffcc"
| 24
| December 22, 1992
| @ Atlanta
| W 130–114
|
|
|
| The Omni
| 13–11
|- align="center" bgcolor="#ccffcc"
| 25
| December 23, 1992
| Detroit
| W 107–95
|
|
|
| Charlotte Coliseum
| 14–11
|- align="center" bgcolor="#ffcccc"
| 26
| December 28, 1992
| @ New Jersey
| L 103–104
|
|
|
| Brendan Byrne Arena
| 14–12
|- align="center" bgcolor="#ffcccc"
| 27
| December 29, 1992
| Chicago
| L 103–104
|
|
|
| Charlotte Coliseum
| 14–13

|- align="center" bgcolor="#ccffcc"
| 28
| January 2, 1993
| New Jersey
| W 104–103
|
|
|
| Charlotte Coliseum
| 15–13
|- align="center" bgcolor="#ffcccc"
| 29
| January 5, 1993
| Boston
| L 103–107
|
|
|
| Charlotte Coliseum
| 15–14
|- align="center" bgcolor="#ccffcc"
| 30
| January 8, 1993
| L.A. Clippers
| W 115–101
|
|
|
| Charlotte Coliseum
| 16–14
|- align="center" bgcolor="#ccffcc"
| 31
| January 11, 1993
| @ Dallas
| W 132–113
|
|
|
| Reunion Arena
| 17–14
|- align="center" bgcolor="#ffcccc"
| 32
| January 14, 1993
| @ Houston
| L 107–111
|
|
|
| The Summit
| 17–15
|- align="center" bgcolor="#ffcccc"
| 33
| January 16, 1993
| @ San Antonio
| L 111–124
|
|
|
| HemisFair Arena
| 17–16
|- align="center" bgcolor="#ffcccc"
| 34
| January 19, 1993
| Atlanta
| L 100–102
|
|
|
| Charlotte Coliseum
| 17–17
|- align="center" bgcolor="#ffcccc"
| 35
| January 20, 1993
| @ New York
| L 91–114
|
|
|
| Madison Square Garden
| 17–18
|- align="center" bgcolor="#ccffcc"
| 36
| January 22, 1993
| @ Chicago
| W 105–97
|
|
|
| Chicago Stadium
| 18–18
|- align="center" bgcolor="#ffcccc"
| 37
| January 24, 1993
| Indiana
| L 105–112
|
|
|
| Charlotte Coliseum
| 18–19
|- align="center" bgcolor="#ccffcc"
| 38
| January 27, 1993
| Sacramento
| W 117–107
|
|
|
| Charlotte Coliseum
| 19–19
|- align="center" bgcolor="#ffcccc"
| 39
| January 29, 1993
| L.A. Lakers
| L 108–123
|
|
|
| Charlotte Coliseum
| 19–20
|- align="center" bgcolor="#ccffcc"
| 40
| January 30, 1993
| @ Washington
| W 127–121 (OT)
|
|
|
| Capital Centre
| 20–20

|- align="center" bgcolor="#ccffcc"
| 41
| February 1, 1993
| Seattle
| W 112–100
|
|
|
| Charlotte Coliseum
| 21–20
|- align="center" bgcolor="#ccffcc"
| 42
| February 3, 1993
| @ Philadelphia
| W 129–118
|
|
|
| The Spectrum
| 22–20
|- align="center" bgcolor="#ccffcc"
| 43
| February 5, 1993
| Milwaukee
| W 118–111
|
|
|
| Charlotte Coliseum
| 22–20
|- align="center" bgcolor="#ffcccc"
| 44
| February 9, 1993
| Cleveland
| L 103–107
|
|
|
| Charlotte Coliseum
| 23–21
|- align="center" bgcolor="#ccffcc"
| 45
| February 11, 1993
| Orlando
| W 116–107
|
|
|
| Charlotte Coliseum
| 24–21
|- align="center" bgcolor="#ccffcc"
| 46
| February 12, 1993
| @ Miami
| W 116–107
|
|
|
| Miami Arena
| 25–21
|- align="center" bgcolor="#ccffcc"
| 47
| February 14, 1993
| Detroit
| W 117–107
|
|
|
| Charlotte Coliseum
| 26–21
|- align="center" bgcolor="#ffcccc"
| 48
| February 15, 1993
| @ Milwaukee
| L 122–128
|
|
|
| Bradley Center
| 26–22
|- align="center" bgcolor="#ffcccc"
| 49
| February 17, 1993
| New York
| L 116–124
|
|
|
| Charlotte Coliseum
| 26–23
|- align="center"
|colspan="9" bgcolor="#bbcaff"|All-Star Break
|- style="background:#cfc;"
|- bgcolor="#bbffbb"
|- align="center" bgcolor="#ccffcc"
| 50
| February 23, 1993
| New Jersey
| W 104–95
|
|
|
| Charlotte Coliseum
| 27–23
|- align="center" bgcolor="#ccffcc"
| 51
| February 25, 1993
| San Antonio
| W 111–104
|
|
|
| Charlotte Coliseum
| 28–23
|- align="center" bgcolor="#ffcccc"
| 52
| February 26, 1993
| @ Indiana
| L 105–137
|
|
|
| Market Square Arena
| 28–24
|- align="center" bgcolor="#ffcccc"
| 53
| February 28, 1993
| @ Denver
| L 103–110
|
|
|
| McNichols Sports Arena
| 28–25

|- align="center" bgcolor="#ccffcc"
| 54
| March 1, 1993
| @ Utah
| W 110–107
|
|
|
| Delta Center
| 29–24
|- align="center" bgcolor="#ffcccc"
| 55
| March 4, 1993
| @ Seattle
| L 112–138
|
|
|
| Seattle Center Coliseum
| 29–26
|- align="center" bgcolor="#ccffcc"
| 56
| March 5, 1993
| @ Portland
| W 94–92
|
|
|
| Memorial Coliseum
| 30–26
|- align="center" bgcolor="#ccffcc"
| 57
| March 7, 1993
| @ L.A. Lakers
| W 105–101
|
|
|
| Great Western Forum
| 31–26
|- align="center" bgcolor="#ccffcc"
| 58
| March 9, 1993
| Washington
| W 124–104
|
|
|
| Charlotte Coliseum
| 32–26
|- align="center" bgcolor="#ffcccc"
| 59
| March 11, 1993
| @ Cleveland
| L 99–118
|
|
|
| Richfield Coliseum
| 32–27
|- align="center" bgcolor="#ffcccc"
| 60
| March 12, 1993
| @ Chicago
| L 108–123
|
|
|
| Chicago Stadium
| 32–28
|- align="center" bgcolor="#ccffcc"
| 61
| March 14, 1993
| @ Boston
| W 96–93
|
|
|
| Boston Garden
| 33–28
|- align="center" bgcolor="#ffcccc"
| 62
| March 16, 1993
| Atlanta
| L 107–122
|
|
|
| Charlotte Coliseum
| 33–29
|- align="center" bgcolor="#ccffcc"
| 63
| March 18, 1993
| Minnesota
| W 113–85
|
|
|
| Charlotte Coliseum
| 34–29
|- align="center" bgcolor="#ffcccc"
| 64
| March 19, 1993
| @ Indiana
| L 108–112
|
|
|
| Market Square Arena
| 34–30
|- align="center" bgcolor="#ccffcc"
| 65
| March 21, 1993
| @ Minnesota
| W 99–95
|
|
|
| Target Center
| 35–30
|- align="center" bgcolor="#ffcccc"
| 66
| March 23, 1993
| Houston
| L 103–111
|
|
|
| Charlotte Coliseum
| 35–31
|- align="center" bgcolor="#ffcccc"
| 67
| March 24, 1993
| @ New Jersey
| L 116–118
|
|
|
| Brendan Byrne Arena
| 35–32
|- align="center" bgcolor="#ffcccc"
| 68
| March 26, 1993
| @ Detroit
| L 107–115
|
|
|
| The Palace of Auburn Hills
| 35–33
|- align="center" bgcolor="#ffcccc"
| 69
| March 28, 1993
| Portland
| L 114–121
|
|
|
| Charlotte Coliseum
| 35–34
|- align="center" bgcolor="#ffcccc"
| 70
| March 30, 1993
| Miami
| L 89–116
|
|
|
| Charlotte Coliseum
| 35–35

|- align="center" bgcolor="#ccffcc"
| 71
| April 1, 1993
| @ Orlando
| W 102–93
|
|
|
| Orlando Arena
| 36–35
|- align="center" bgcolor="#ccffcc"
| 72
| April 2, 1993
| Cleveland
| W 114–113
|
|
|
| Charlotte Coliseum
| 37–35
|- align="center" bgcolor="#ffcccc"
| 73
| April 7, 1993
| Orlando
| L 96–109
|
|
|
| Charlotte Coliseum
| 37–36
|- align="center" bgcolor="#ccffcc"
| 74
| April 9, 1993
| @ Philadelphia
| W 122–113
|
|
|
| The Spectrum
| 38–36
|- align="center" bgcolor="#ffcccc"
| 75
| April 10, 1993
| Atlanta
| L 105–118
|
|
|
| Charlotte Coliseum
| 38–37
|- align="center" bgcolor="#ccffcc"
| 76
| April 12, 1993
| Philadelphia
| W 120–101
|
|
|
| Charlotte Coliseum
| 39–37
|- align="center" bgcolor="#ffcccc"
| 77
| April 14, 1993
| New York
| L 107–111
|
|
|
| Charlotte Coliseum
| 39–38
|- align="center" bgcolor="#ccffcc"
| 78
| April 16, 1993
| Detroit
| W 127–93
|
|
|
| Charlotte Coliseum
| 40–38
|- align="center" bgcolor="#ccffcc"
| 79
| April 17, 1993
| @ Atlanta
| W 110–107
|
|
|
| The Omni
| 41–38
|- align="center" bgcolor="#ccffcc"
| 80
| April 21, 1993
| Milwaukee
| W 119–111
|
|
|
| Charlotte Coliseum
| 41–38
|- align="center" bgcolor="#ccffcc"
| 81
| April 23, 1993
| Chicago
| W 104–103
|
|
|
| Charlotte Coliseum
| 43–38
|- align="center" bgcolor="#ccffcc"
| 82
| April 24, 1993
| @ Milwaukee
| W 108–106
|
|
|
| Bradley Center
| 44–38

Playoffs

|- align="center" bgcolor="#ffcccc"
| 1
| April 29, 1993
| @ Boston
| L 101–112
| Gill, Mourning (30)
| Larry Johnson (13)
| Muggsy Bogues (15)
| Boston Garden14,890
| 0–1
|- align="center" bgcolor="#ccffcc"
| 2
| May 1, 1993
| @ Boston
| W 99–98 (2OT)
| Larry Johnson (23)
| Alonzo Mourning (14)
| Muggsy Bogues (8)
| Boston Garden14,890
| 1–1
|- align="center" bgcolor="#ccffcc"
| 3
| May 3, 1993
| Boston
| W 119–89
| Larry Johnson (29)
| Larry Johnson (11)
| Muggsy Bogues (7)
| Charlotte Coliseum23,698
| 2–1
|- align="center" bgcolor="#ccffcc"
| 4
| May 5, 1993
| Boston
| W 104–103
| Alonzo Mourning (33)
| Alonzo Mourning (7)
| Muggsy Bogues (9)
| Charlotte Coliseum23,698
| 3–1

|- align="center" bgcolor="#ffcccc"
| 1
| May 9, 1993
| @ New York
| L 95–111
| Alonzo Mourning (27)
| Alonzo Mourning (13)
| Muggsy Bogues (8)
| Madison Square Garden19,763
| 0–1
|- align="center" bgcolor="#ffcccc"
| 2
| May 12, 1993
| @ New York
| L 101–105 (OT)
| Alonzo Mourning (24)
| Sidney Green (10)
| Muggsy Bogues (7)
| Madison Square Garden19,763
| 0–2
|- align="center" bgcolor="#ccffcc"
| 3
| May 14, 1993
| New York
| W 110–106 (2OT)
| Alonzo Mourning (34)
| Alonzo Mourning (10)
| Muggsy Bogues (8)
| Charlotte Coliseum23,698
| 1–2
|- align="center" bgcolor="#ffcccc"
| 4
| May 16, 1993
| New York
| L 92–94
| Larry Johnson (24)
| Alonzo Mourning (8)
| Muggsy Bogues (5)
| Charlotte Coliseum23,698
| 1–3
|- align="center" bgcolor="#ffcccc"
| 5
| May 18, 1993
| @ New York
| L 101–105
| Kendall Gill (26)
| Alonzo Mourning (12)
| Kendall Gill (6)
| Madison Square Garden19,763
| 1–4
|-

Player statistics

Season

Playoffs

Awards and Records
 Larry Johnson, All-NBA Second Team
 Alonzo Mourning, NBA All-Rookie Team 1st Team

Transactions
 August 31, 1992

Signed LaMark Baker as a free agent.
 October 2, 1992

Signed Lorenzo Williams as a free agent.
 October 7, 1992

Elliot Perry signed as an unrestricted free agent with the Portland Trail Blazers.
 November 2, 1992

Waived LaMark Baker.
 November 12, 1992

Waived Lorenzo Williams.
 November 18, 1992

Signed David Wingate as a free agent.
 December 9, 1992

Traded J.R. Reid to the San Antonio Spurs for Sidney Green, a 1993 1st round draft pick (Scott Burrell was later selected) and a 1996 2nd round draft pick (Ronnie Henderson was later selected).
 January 26, 1993

Waived Tom Hammonds.

Player Transactions Citation:

References

External links
 Hornets on Database Basketball

Charlotte Hornets seasons
Charlotte Hornets
Charlotte Hornets
Charlotte Hornets